A music box (also musical box) is a 19th-century automatic musical instrument.

Music box or musical box may also refer to:

Music

Albums 
Music Box (Evelyn King album), 1979
Music Box (Mariah Carey album), 1993
Music Box (The Monkees album), 2001

Songs 
"Music Box" (song), a 2009 song by Eminem
"The Musical Box" (song), a 1971 song by Genesis
"Music Box", a song by Regina Spektor on a bonus disc of her album Begin to Hope
"Music Box", a 1993 song by Roni Size and DJ Die
"Music Box", a 1993 song by Mariah Carey from the album Music Box
"Music Box", a song by The Cooper Temple Clause from the album Kick Up the Fire, and Let the Flames Break Loose
"Music Box", a song by Thrice from the album Vheissu
"Music Box", a 1969 song by Pisces from the album A Lovely Sight

Other 
 musicbox, a German TV channel
 Music Box Tour, 1993 concert tour by Mariah Carey
 The Musical Box (band), a Genesis tribute band
 Music Box, a contestant on season 6 of the NBC series The Voice
 Music box, alternative name for the Appalachian dulcimer

TV and film
 The Music Box, a 1932 short film starring Laurel and Hardy
 The Music Box (TV series), a 1957 United Kingdom music variety show produced by Associated-Rediffusion
 Music Box (film), a 1989 feature film directed by Costa-Gavras
 The Music Box (2006 film), a 2006 Japanese film by Ng See-yuen
 Music Box (TV channel), an early UK cable channel
 Music Box Italia, an Italian music television channel
 Music Box Films, a distributor of foreign and independent films
 Music Box (TV series), a 1981 Canadian educational television series produced by Heather Conkie

Other
 Music Box Theatre, a Broadway theater in New York City
 Music Box Theatre (Chicago), Chicago, Illinois
 Music Box Theater (Los Angeles), Los Angeles, California
 Musical Box A British Whippet medium tank that achieved fame for actions during the Battle of Amiens
 The Magical Music Box, a children's magazine, featuring classical music to accompany stories
 Music Box (software), educational software which teaches about computer-generated music